Darryl Herrod (born 2 June 1945) is a former Australian rules footballer who played with Geelong and Fitzroy in the Victorian Football League (VFL).

Herrod came to Geelong from Assumption College, in Kilmore. He made over 75 appearances for the Geelong reserves and won the Gardiner Medal in 1966, but managed just seven senior games.

At Fitzroy he put together regular senior appearances, with his most productive season coming in 1970 when he appeared in 19 rounds.

A half back flanker, he spent 1972 and 1973 in Tasmania, with the North Hobart Football Club. He then joined Port Melbourne, as he was a good friend of former Fitzroy teammate and new Port coach Norm Brown.

References

1945 births
Australian rules footballers from Victoria (Australia)
Geelong Football Club players
Fitzroy Football Club players
North Hobart Football Club players
Port Melbourne Football Club players
Living people